Benson Tongo Baba  (born 23 September 1948) is a Ghanaian politician and member of the Seventh Parliament of the Fourth Republic of Ghana representing the Talensi Constituency in the Upper East Region on the ticket of the National Democratic Congress.

Early life and education 
Benson hails from Tengzuk-Tongo. He holds a teacher’s Cert A from the Pusiga Training College and University of Education Winneba.

References 

Ghanaian MPs 2017–2021
1948 births
Living people
National Democratic Congress (Ghana) politicians
Ghanaian MPs 2021–2025